The Ramshead Range, a mountain range that is part of the Snowy Mountains, is located in the Monaro region of New South Wales and the Alpine region of Victoria, Australia.

Location and features
The range extends from the southwest near Mount Cobberas No. 1 in Victoria, across the Black-Allen Line that defines the straight line border between the two states, towards the northeast near Thredbo in New South Wales.

The number of peaks in the Ramshead Range is debatable: however it is commonly accepted that the South Ramshead, the Rams Head and the North Ramshead are all proper peaks. The peak between Rams Head and North Ramshead is sometimes known as the 'Central' Ramshead.

The range is generally covered in snow from June through to October, making it suitable for cross-country skiing. The range is most commonly accessed from Dead Horse Gap or by the Kosciuszko Express Quad Chair at Thredbo, and is not far south of Mount Kosciuszko, the highest mainland point in Australia.

References

Snowy Mountains